Kyle Rhea is a strait of water in the Highland area of Scotland. It runs from the Inner Seas off the West Coast of Scotland in the southwest to Loch Alsh in the northeast, separating the Isle of Skye from Inverness-shire on the Scottish mainland. It gave its name to Kylerhea, a village on its western shore.

Loch Hourn branches off to the east at about its midpoint.

Just north of Kylerhea, a ferry service has linked the village with Glenelg on the mainland for centuries. The first car ferry was introduced in 1935, with a turntable located on the boat. Despite the existence of the now toll-free Skye Bridge, this ferry service, undertaken by the MV Glenachulish, still runs during the summer months, due to its popularity as the more scenic and traditional route between Skye and the mainland. This service is now community-owned but used to be run by Murdo Mackenzie for almost twenty years.

Kyle Rhea is mentioned in Sir Thomas Dick Lauder's novel Highland Legends.

Gallery

References

External links
Kyle Rhea – Scottish-Places.info
19th-century map of Kyle Rhea – National Library of Scotland

Rivers of Highland (council area)